Flaminia Simonetti (born 17 February 1997) is an Italian professional footballer who plays as a midfielder for Serie A club Inter Milan and the Italy women's national team.

Career

Club career

At the age of 14, Simonetti debuted for Italian side Roma CF. In 2016, she signed for FC Neunkirch in Switzerland but left after a few days due to homesickness. After that, she signed for Italian club Roma.

International career

Simonetti represented Italy at the UEFA Women's Euro 2022.

Personal life

She is the sister of footballer Pier Luigi Simonetti.

References

External links
 

1997 births
Women's association football midfielders
Expatriate women's footballers in Switzerland
FC Neunkirch players
Inter Milan (women) players
Italian expatriate sportspeople in Switzerland
Italian women's footballers
Italy women's international footballers
Living people
Serie A (women's football) players
S.S.D. Empoli Ladies FBC players